The Guam Department of Agriculture is a government agency in the United States territory of Guam. Its headquarters are in the village Mangilao.

References

External links

 Guam Department of Agriculture

Government of Guam
State departments of agriculture of the United States
1924 establishments in Guam